Andrew Hood may refer to:

 Andrew Hood (author), Canadian author
 Andrew Hood (businessman), British businessman